The Hotel 7 Arches Jerusalem is a hotel in East Jerusalem in the Arab neighborhood of at-Tur on the Mount of Olives. The hotel overlooks the old city of Jerusalem.

History

The hotel was built by the Jordanian government on land that belongs to the Islamic Waqf in Jerusalem. The hotel opened on March 20, 1964, as the Hotel Jerusalem Intercontinental,  managed by the US Intercontinental Hotels chain. The Palestine Liberation Organization held its first Palestinian National Council conference at the hotel in May 1964. The hotel was slightly renamed in 1966, becoming the Hotel Inter-Continental Jerusalem, when the chain altered their branding. After the Six-Day War, and the loss of Jordanian sovereignty over Jerusalem, the property was entrusted to the Custodian of Absentee Property. In 1989, as a result of the First Intifada, Inter-Continental Hotels chose not to renew their management agreement with the hotel, an agreement which was first signed with the Jordanians, and later with the Custodian. The hotel changed its name to the 7 Arches Hotel, and the Custodian entrusted the management of the hotel to a local management team.  The hotel has fifty employees. All, including the management team, are East Jerusalemites.

Today
The 7 Arches is a 4-star hotel with 196 rooms notable for its views of Jerusalem. Despite reports in 2010 that plans had been submitted for expansion of the hotel, the general manager of the 7 Arches, Awni Inshewat, denied this. He said there had been some confusion over an application for a building permit for a large Christian prayer tent located at the site: "The tent has been there for about five years, but the municipality said it needs a building permit, so we applied for that."

References

External links
Hotel 7 Arches Jerusalem official website

Hotels in Jerusalem
Mount of Olives
Hotels established in 1964
Jordanian construction in eastern Jerusalem
Hotel buildings completed in 1964
1960s in Jerusalem